William Hallaran (19 April 1861 – 23 January 1917) was an Irish rugby international. He won one cap against Wales on 12 April 1884.

His father was Archdeacon of Ardfert from 1915 to 1922. He was educated at Trinity College Dublin  after which he was a doctor in the RAMC.

Notes

1861 births
1917 deaths
Irish rugby union players
Ireland international rugby union players
Alumni of Trinity College Dublin
People from County Cork
Royal Army Medical Corps officers
British Army personnel of World War I
British military personnel killed in World War I
Rugby union players from County Tipperary